"Samba de Janeiro" is a song by German pop group Bellini. It was released on 5 May 1997 in Germany and on 15 September in the United Kingdom as the lead single from their debut album of the same name (1997). The song was a hit throughout Europe, reaching number-one in Hungary and the top 10 in at least 12 countries. It interpolates the chorus of Airto Moreira's 1972 song "Tombo In 7/4", as well as samples the drum rhythm from Moreira's "Celebration Suite". "Samba de Janeiro" won the award for best dance single at the 7th Annual Echo Awards.

Critical reception
Alan Jones from Music Week wrote, "Fitting in with the current vogue for all things Latin, Bellini's Samba De Janiero is maddeningly familiar from first hearing — probably because fellow Virgin recording act The Heartists' single Belo Horizonte is essentially the same song. Bright, breezy, commercial and a hit whose time has come."

Chart performance
"Samba de Janeiro" was very successful on the charts in Europe, peaking at number-one in Hungary and it was a number two hit in both Germany and Switzerland. It made it to the top 10 also in Austria, Belgium, Denmark, Finland, France, Iceland, Ireland, the Netherlands, Scotland and the United Kingdom, as well as on the Eurochart Hot 100, where the single reached number three. In the UK, it peaked at number eight in its first week at the UK Singles Chart, on September 21, 1997. It charted also on the UK Dance Chart, peaking at number 12. Additionally, "Samba de Janeiro" was a top 20 hit in Norway and a top 30 hit in Sweden.

Music video
A music video was produced to promote the single. It was later published on YouTube in August 2017. As of June 2022, it has more than 25.7 million views.

Legacy
The melody of "Samba de Janeiro" was played during the 2008 UEFA European Football Championship after every goal. It was also a notable theme in the Samba de Amigo video game series, and is featured in crossover games such as Sega Superstars Tennis and Sonic & Sega All-Stars Racing.

The song makes several appearances in the Bemani series in Japan:
A cover of "Samba de Janeiro" by Bass Fist! featuring Boogie Girl, from Dancemania Bass, appears in Dance Dance Revolution Solo Bass Mix and Solo 2000.
"Trance de Janeiro", a remix of Bellini's song, appears in DDRMAX2 Dance Dance Revolution 7thMix.
A cover/remix by Lion Musashi appears in beatmania IIDX 13: DistorteD.

The song is included as an on-disc title in Harmonix's Dance Central 3 for Xbox 360.

The song is also featured as a cover by Ultraclub 90 in the dance rhythm game, Just Dance 2021.

It is also used as Norwich City goal celebration song. Bolton Wanderers used it for a few years in the early 2010s.

The song is still very popular in Finland. Presenters Viki and Köpi of the Finnish radio broadcaster YleX play it up to a hundred times every Friday and on certain days, such as during the charity event Naurumaraton (Laughter Marathon).

Track listings

 12" single
 "Samba de Janeiro" (Original Version) – 5:38
 "Samba de Janeiro" (Peter Parker Rmx) – 5:52

 CD single
 "Samba de Janeiro" (Radio Edit) – 2:50
 "Samba de Janeiro" (Club Mix) – 5:38
 "Samba de Janeiro" (Vanity Back Yard Remix) – 5:18
 "Samba de Janeiro" (Peter Parker Remix) – 5:52
 "Samba de Janeiro" (John Acquaviva Remix) – 7:59
 "Samba de Janeiro" (Merlyn Remix) – 6:00

 CD maxi
 "Samba de Janeiro" (Radio Edit) – 2:50	
 "Samba de Janeiro" (Club Mix) – 5:38	
 "Samba de Janeiro" (Vanity Back Yard Remix) – 5:18	
 "Samba de Janeiro" (Peter Parker Remix) – 5:52

 Cassette single
 "Samba de Janeiro" (Radio Edit) – 2:50
 "Samba de Janeiro" (Club Mix) – 5:38
 "Samba de Janeiro" (Vanity Back Yard Mix) – 5:18
 "Samba de Janeiro" (Radio Edit) – 2:50
 "Samba de Janeiro" (Club Mix) – 5:38
 "Samba de Janeiro" (Vanity Back Yard Mix) – 5:18

Charts

Weekly charts

Year-end charts

References

1997 songs
1997 singles
Eurodance songs
Number-one singles in Hungary
PolyGram singles
Portuguese-language songs
Songs about dancing
Songs about Rio de Janeiro (city)
Latin house songs